Thomas Township is a township in Ellsworth County, Kansas, USA.

Geography

Demographics
In 1898, the population was 256, in 1900, the population dropped down to 215.

References

External links
 City-Data.com

Townships in Ellsworth County, Kansas
Townships in Kansas